Daledalin (UK-3557-15) is an antidepressant which was synthesized and trialed for depression in the early 1970s, but was never marketed. It is a selective norepinephrine reuptake inhibitor, with no significant effects on the reuptake of serotonin and dopamine, and no antihistamine or anticholinergic properties.

Synthesis

See also 
 Amedalin

References 

Abandoned drugs
Amines
Antidepressants
Indolines
Norepinephrine reuptake inhibitors